AmeriCorps VISTA is a national service program designed to alleviate poverty. President John F. Kennedy originated the idea for VISTA, which was founded as Volunteers in Service to America in 1965, and incorporated into the AmeriCorps network of programs in 1993. VISTA is an acronym for Volunteers in Service to America.

On March 11, 2018, President Donald Trump sent his official Fiscal Year 2020 (FY 2020) Budget request to Congress. As outlined in his previous fiscal year budgets, this budget proposes the elimination of the Corporation for National and Community Service (CNCS) in FY 2020. It provides funding for an orderly shutdown, including all CNCS programs, such as Senior Corps and AmeriCorps (which includes VISTA and NCCC). In FY 2019, VISTA was funded at its FY 2017 and FY 2018 levels of $92,364,000 while AmeriCorps (not NCCC) and Senior Corps received increases in their funding levels.

Background
VISTA is an anti-poverty program created by Lyndon Johnson's Economic Opportunity Act of 1964 as the domestic version of the Peace Corps. Initially, the program increased employment opportunities for conscientious people who felt they could contribute tangibly to the War on Poverty. Volunteers served in communities throughout the U.S., focusing on enriching educational programs and vocational training for the nation's underprivileged classes.

As defined under the Domestic Volunteer Service Act (DVSA) of 1973, VISTA's legislative purpose is to supplement efforts to fight poverty in low-income communities by engaging Americans from all walks of life in a year of full-time service. VISTA members support the program's purpose through three primary objectives: 1) encouraging volunteer service at the local level, 2) generating the commitment of private sector resources, and 3) strengthening local agencies and organizations that serve low-income communities. There are approximately 5,000 VISTA members serving in over 900 projects throughout the nation.

During the Clinton Administration, VISTA was brought under the newly created AmeriCorps program, a division of the Corporation for National and Community Service, and was renamed "AmeriCorps*VISTA".  VISTA members sign up with a host agency for a full-time term of service – 365 days. In return for their service, members are provided with orientation and training, a living stipend calculated at no less than 105% of the poverty line, settling in and transportation costs, child care benefits, and a basic health care plan. Upon completion of their one-year term, VISTA members have the option of receiving a cash award or the Segal AmeriCorps Education Award. There is also the option for individuals to serve as Summer Associates for terms of 8, 9 or 10 weeks alongside full-time VISTA members for a reduced AmeriCorps Education Award.

Directors

The first Director of VISTA was Glenn W. Ferguson and there have been many appointed and acting directors since then. Meg Ansara currently serves as the Director for AmeriCorps VISTA.

Oversight
Created by the National and Community Service Trust Act of 1993, the Corporation for National and Community Service Office of Inspector General (OIG) conducts and supervises independent and objective audits and investigations of Corporation programs and operations. Based on the results of these audits, reviews, and investigations, the OIG recommends policies to promote economy and efficiency and prevent and detect fraud and abuse in the Corporation's programs and operations.

Member pledge
Most AmeriCorps VISTA members are required by federal law to take the same oath that federal employees take:

See also 

 List of VISTA volunteers

References

External links
 
 A Personal Journey of Images from 1968 to 1969 by a VISTA volunteer
 Finding Aid: Billy E. Barnes Photographic Collection, 1959–1996, in the North Carolina Collection Photographic Archives, UNC–Chapel Hill

Poverty in the United States
AmeriCorps
 
1965 establishments in the United States
Service year programs in the United States